The Split–Karlovac Fault is a major fault line in Croatia. It extends from Split in the south to Karlovac in the north. The faults movements are dextral-transpressive, with the eastern block thrusting towards the west. The fault was active during the Miocene. It runs mostly within the High Karst Unit.

References

Further reading
 

Geology of Croatia
Seismic faults of Europe